Scannlán mac Fearghal, ancestor of the Ó Scannláin family of County Galway, .

Scannlán was a member of the Uí Fiachrach Aidhne dynasty of south County Galway, and is listed in the genealogies as a seventeen-times great-grandson of King Guaire Aidne mac Colmáin of Connacht, who died in 663. His immediate descendants would use his name as their surname, and for a time be of some prominence in Aidhne, but were pushed out of power by their kinsmen and remained only a minor family, some moving to Thomond/County Clare. 

Scannlán was a kinsman of a number of other men whose descendants also took their surnames from them, such as

 Comhaltan mac Maol Cúlaird - Ó Comhaltan/Colton/Coulton
 Seachnasach mac Donnchadh - Ó Seachnasaigh/Shaughnessy
 Eidhean mac Cléireach - Ó Cléirigh/Cleary
 Cathal mac Ógán - Ó Cathail/Cahill
 Giolla Ceallaigh mac Comhaltan - MacGiolla Ceallaigh/Kilkelly

Though in many cases the relationship between these men was quite distant, Scannlán would have been a contemporary or near-contemporary of almost all of them.

References
 The Surnames of Ireland, Edward MacLysaght, Dublin, 1978.
 Irish Kings and High Kings, Francis John Byrne, 2001 (second edition).
 The Great Book of Irish Genealogies, 257.9, pp. 586-87, volume one, Dubhaltach MacFhirbhisigh; edited, with translation and indices by Nollaig Ó Muraíle, 2003-2004. .

People from County Galway
10th-century Irish people